The Kinmen Peace Memorial Park is a memorial park in Jinning Township, Kinmen County, Taiwan.

History
The memorial park was established to commemorate General Hu Lien in the victory of Battle of Guningtou.

Architecture
The memorial park features a memorial hall which displays information and photos about the Battle of Guningtou and General Hu Lien. At its courtyard, lies a giant peace bell made of fragments of bombshells.

References

Buildings and structures in Kinmen County
Jinning Township
Memorial parks in Taiwan
Tourist attractions in Kinmen County